= Haitō =

Defense technique

Japanese name
- Kanji: 背 刀

The term Haitō (Japanese: 背 刀, English sword back) means the inner edge of the hand, hand edge of the thumb side. One reaches out the four fingers, bends the first joint of the thumb and presses it against the side of the palm.

For the stroke (Uchi waza) the root of the index finger is used. You can attack the temple, the chin, the back of the head, the throat, face, and stomach. With Haitō you can also perform defense techniques (Uke waza). literature
